"It's the Things You Do" is the fifth single from British boy band Five's debut studio album, 5ive (1998). Written by Max Martin, George Shahin, Herbie Crichlow and Five, the song was released as a single exclusively in the United States. The song charted at number 53 on the Billboard Hot 100.

Song variations
 Four alternate versions of the song exist. The first version, the 'UK version', is featured on the UK version of the album 5ive. It features a rap verse and a mellow beat.
 The second version, the 'US album version', features on the US version of 5ive. This version features an alternate rap, often labelled the 'Coca-Cola Rap' in reference to the lyrics, and a totally different beat to the UK version.
 The third version, the 'US Single version', is the version of the song released as a single. It features the beat of the US album version, but removes the rap verse and replaces it with a new verse sung by Scott.
 The fourth version appears on the group's Greatest Hits album. It features the beat of the UK version, but cuts some lyrics, and uses some from the US Single Version.

Music video
The video for the song was directed by Nigel Dick, who had previously directed the video for the band's second single, "When the Lights Go Out". The video was recorded at the Willow Springs Raceway in California, on 23 and 24 November 1998. It was produced by David Robertson. In the video, the band are seen entering a race car into the race being held at the race track that day. They then take it turns to drive the car, whilst the remaining members of the band watch from the sidelines. The video also depicts the band performing parts of the track inside the area designated as 'the pits'

Track listing
 US Promotional single
 "It's the Things You Do" [Radio Edit Without Rap] - 3:25
 "It's the Things You Do" [Radio Edit With Rap] - 3:25
 "It's the Things You Do" [Call Out Research Hook] - 0:10

 US CD1
 "It's the Things You Do" [US Single Remix] - 3:25
 "Don't You Want It?" - 3:41

 US CD2
 "It's the Things You Do" [US Single Remix] - 3:25
 "It's the Things You Do" [Sean & Dave's Extended Mix] - 4:37
 "Don't You Want It?" - 3:41
 "Human" [The Five Remix] - 3:55

 US Cassette single
 "It's the Things You Do" - 3:25
 "Don't You Want It?" - 3:41

 United Kingdom Cassette single
 I Want You Back - 3.20
 It's the Things You Do - 3.36

Charts

Weekly charts

References

1999 singles
Five (band) songs
Songs written by Max Martin
Arista Records singles
Songs written by Herbie Crichlow
Song recordings produced by Max Martin
1998 songs
Music videos directed by Nigel Dick
1998 singles